Carl Ray Stephens, Jr. is a former Major League Baseball catcher who played for the St. Louis Cardinals and Texas Rangers between 1990 and 1992.

Born on September 22, 1962, in Houston, Texas, Stephens attended Bradley Central High School in Cleveland, Tennessee. He attended Troy State University and Middle Georgia College.

Drafted by the Cardinals in the 6th round of the 1985 amateur draft, Stephens was not a very successful minor leaguer when it came to hitting-he had a career minor league average of .238-and in 1988 with Louisville, he batted only .189 in 115 games.

Nevertheless, on September 20, 1990, at the age of 27, Stephens made his Major League debut. Even though he went 1 for 3 in his Major League debut with his first Major League hit being a home run, his career never quite panned out-he hit only .133 in his rookie year (his second of two hits that season was a double, though). His career average ended up being .171.

In the field, he made zero errors over the course of his career for a 1.000 fielding percentage.

Stephens played his final professional game on October 3, 1992, at the age of 29.

Other information
He earned $100,000 in 1990 and $179,000 in 1992.
In 1990 and 1991, he wore the number 54. In 1992, he wore 24.
He currently resides in Charleston, Tennessee.
He currently volunteers as a coach for his alma mater, Bradley Central High School

External links
, or Retrosheet
Pura Pelota (Venezuelan Winter League)

1962 births
Living people
Arkansas Travelers players
Baseball players from Houston
Cleveland State Community College alumni
Cleveland State Cougars baseball players
Erie Cardinals players
Louisville Redbirds players
Major League Baseball catchers
Oklahoma City 89ers players
Savannah Cardinals players
Scranton/Wilkes-Barre Red Barons players
St. Louis Cardinals players
Texas Rangers players
Tigres de Aragua players
American expatriate baseball players in Venezuela
Troy Trojans baseball players
Troy University alumni
Middle Georgia Warriors baseball players